Coinage of the South Sea Company was minted in Britain in 1723, after the South Sea Company (SSC) discovered silver in (and shipped it back from) Indonesia in 1722. The coins minted were Crowns, Half Crowns, Shillings and Sixpences. The Crown is the rarest of them, although the Half-Crown is also difficult to find in higher than VF condition. The shilling is common, with even mint state examples being easily found. The sixpence is common in most grades, though mint condition ones are rare. All these coins carry "SSC" in the reverse quarters of the cruciform shields.

Several die errors and corrections of interest exist on the shilling, including the slightly scarce error SS/C where an engraver accidentally punched the C in the wrong place and then stamped the SS over it. On these pieces you can see a faint C under the SS. There is also a far rarer variety, which catalogues near £100 in F condition, where the whole collection of shields is rotated.

Coins of Great Britain
1723 in Great Britain
Silver coins